An endangered language is a language that is at a risk of falling out of use, generally because it has few surviving speakers. If it loses all of its native speakers, it becomes an extinct language. UNESCO defines four levels of language endangerment between "safe" (not endangered) and "extinct":
 Vulnerable
 Definitely endangered
 Severely endangered
 Critically endangered

India 

The following table lists the 192 languages of India that are classified as vulnerable or endangered.

References 

India
Languages of India